Amaras Monastery is an Armenian monastery near the village of Sos, de facto in the Martuni Province of the Republic of Artsakh, de jure in the Khojavend District of Azerbaijan, in the disputed region of Nagorno-Karabakh. It was a prominent religious and educational center in medieval Armenia. 

Azerbaijan denies the monastery's Armenian Apostolic heritage, instead referring to it as "Caucasian Albanian".

History

4th–5th centuries 
According to medieval chroniclers Faustus Byuzand and Movses Kaghankatvatsi, St. Gregory the Illuminator, the patron saint and evangelizer of Armenia, founded the Amaras Monastery at the start of the fourth century.

Amaras was the burial place of St. Gregory the Illuminator's grandson, St. Grigoris (died in 338). A tomb built for his remains  survives under the apse of the nineteenth-century Church of St. Grigoris.

At the beginning of the fifth century Mesrop Mashtots, the inventor of the Armenian alphabet, established in Amaras the first-ever school that used his script.

Destruction and restoration (13th–19th centuries) 
The monastery was plundered in the thirteenth century by the Mongols, destroyed in 1387 during Timur's invasion, and demolished again in the sixteenth century. It underwent radical restructuring in the second quarter of the seventeenth century when the surviving defensive walls were constructed.

Amaras was later abandoned, and in the first half of the nineteenth century the monastery was used as a frontier fortress by Russian imperial troops.

The Armenian Apostolic Church reclaimed the monastery in 1848. The monastery's church appears to have been severely damaged during the period of military occupation, to the extent that a new church had to be constructed on the site of the old one. This new church, dedicated to St. Grigoris, was built in 1858 and paid for by the Armenians of the city of Shushi.

Tomb of St. Grigoris 
St. Grigoris was originally buried at the eastern end of the now-vanished St. Gregory Church. Archeologists think that the eastern entrance of the tomb, which is unusual for traditional church architecture, is based on the Church of the Holy Sepulchre in Jerusalem. In 489 Vachagan III the Pious, king of Caucasian Albania, renovated Amaras, restoring the church and constructing a new chapel for the remains of St. Grigoris. In later centuries, a church was built over this chapel-tomb.

Under the altar of the St. Grigoris church is a tomb chamber, reached at its western end by twin flights of steps. A blocked passage at its eastern end indicates that there was originally an entrance from that direction as well. The barrel-vaulted tomb chamber is 1.9 m wide, 3.75 m long, and 3.5 m high. The upper half of the structure originally projected 1.5 to 2 m above ground level, but it is now entirely underground. Carved details date it stylistically to the 5th century.

Gallery

See also 
 Armenian culture
 Armenian architecture
 Architecture of Azerbaijan
 Culture of Nagorno-Karabakh

References

External links 

 Amaras Monastery, official site
 About Amaras Monastery

Armenian culture
Armenian buildings in Azerbaijan
Armenian Apostolic Church
Armenian Apostolic churches
Armenian Apostolic monasteries
Armenian Apostolic monasteries in Azerbaijan
Christian monasteries established in the 4th century
4th-century churches
Khojavend District
Martuni (province)